John James Spanish (June 1, 1922 – December 12, 2011) was an American politician, mechanic, and miner.

Biography
Spanish was born in Hibbing, Minnesota and graduated from Hibbing High School. He also went took University of Minnesota vocational extension classes. Spanish served in the United States Navy during World War II. Spanish worked as a mechanic, machinists, and in the iron ore mine. He served on the Hibbing Village Council and was a Democrat. Spanish served in the Minnesota House of Representatives in 1969 and 1970 and from 1973 to 1978. In 2004, he ran for election to the Minnesota House of Representatives on the Independence Party of Minnesota ticket and lost the election. Spanish died at the St. Raphael's Rehabilitation Center in Eveleth, Minnesota.

Notes

External links

1922 births
2011 deaths
People from Hibbing, Minnesota
Military personnel from Minnesota
American miners
University of Minnesota alumni
Independence Party of Minnesota politicians
Minnesota city council members
Democratic Party members of the Minnesota House of Representatives
Hibbing High School alumni
United States Navy personnel of World War II